The 2021 Ghazi Amanullah Khan Regional One Day Tournament was a List A cricket competition that was played in Kandahar, Afghanistan between 15 and 29 October 2021. It was the fifth edition of the competition played with List A status, following the announcements by the International Cricket Council (ICC) in February and May 2017. Mis Ainak Region were the defending champions.

After the completion of group stage, Amo Region beat Band-e-Amir Region in the first semi-final. Mis Ainak Region qualified for the final, having more points than Boost Region on the table after the second semi-final was tied. On 29 October 2021, the defending champions Mis Ainak Region successfully retained their title after they beat the Amo Region in the final, winning the title for the third consecutive time.

Fixtures

Points table

 The top four teams advanced to the semi-finals

Group stage

Finals

References

External links
 Series home at ESPN Cricinfo

Ghazi
Domestic cricket competitions in 2021–22
Ghazi Amanullah Khan Regional One Day Tournament